Kostas Fasouliotis (born 19 August 1970) is a retired Cypriot football midfielder.

References

1970 births
Living people
Cypriot footballers
APOEL FC players
Enosis Neon Paralimni FC players
AEK Larnaca FC players
Association football midfielders
Cyprus international footballers
Cypriot First Division players